Tench Island, also known as Nusi Island, is a small (55 ha), low-lying (17 m maximum height above sea level), coral island in the St Matthias Islands group in the Bismarck Archipelago of Papua New Guinea. Administratively, it is part of New Ireland Province and lies about 100 km north of Kavieng, the provincial capital. It has a human population of about 100.

History
The island was named after British marine officer Watkin Tench in 1790 by Lieutenant Philip Gidley King.

Important Bird Area
The island has been designated an Important Bird Area (IBA) by BirdLife International because it supports breeding populations of brown noddies (80,000 individuals) and black noddies (20,000 individuals), based on 1973 estimates.

References

 

 
Bismarck Archipelago
New Ireland Province
Atolls of Papua New Guinea
Important Bird Areas of Papua New Guinea
Seabird colonies
Important Bird Areas of Oceania